Alias Billy Sargent is a 1912 silent film dramatic short produced by the Essanay Studios and starring Francis X. Bushman. It was distributed by the General Film Company.

Cast
Francis X. Bushman - Weston aka William Sargent
Lily Branscombe - Mrs. Weston
Frank Dayton - Sargent
Evelyn Coates - The Child
Bryant Washburn - Hotel Clerk

See also
Francis X. Bushman filmography

References

External links
 Alias Billy Sargent at IMDb.com

1912 films
Essanay Studios films
1912 short films
American silent short films
Silent American drama films
1912 drama films
American black-and-white films
1910s American films
American drama short films
1910s English-language films